The 1998 Major League Baseball All-Star Game was the 69th playing of the midsummer classic between the all-stars of the American League (AL) and National League (NL), the two leagues comprising Major League Baseball. The game was held on July 7, 1998, at Coors Field in Denver, Colorado, the home of the Colorado Rockies of the National League. The first All-Star contest played in the Mountain Time Zone, the game resulted in the American League defeating the National League 13-8. It remains the highest-scoring All-Star Game in MLB history. Also, it was the last MLB All Star Game not to be held on the 2nd or 3rd Tuesday of July, it was held on the 1st Tuesday of July, and thus the earliest ASG held since then. 

The pregame ceremony honored the United States Air Force Academy who provided the five-man color guard, flag presentations, and, at the end of country music singer Faith Hill's performance of the U.S. National Anthem, the flyover ceremonies.  Hill's National Anthem performance was preceded by actress Gloria Reuben's performance of The Canadian National Anthem.

Twelve-year-old Elias Kurts was given the honor of throwing out the ceremonial first pitch, the first "non-celebrity" so honored.

Rosters
Players in italics have since been inducted into the National Baseball Hall of Fame.

American League

National League

Game

Umpires

Starting lineups

Source:

Game summary

Home Run Derby
The Home Run Derby was won by Ken Griffey Jr., who did not decide to enter the competition until hearing boos from fans during batting practice.

Source:

Notes

References

Further reading

External links
Baseball Almanac

Major League Baseball All-Star Game
Major League Baseball All-Star Game
Sports competitions in Denver
Major League Baseball All Star Game
Baseball in Colorado
1990s in Denver
Major League Baseball All-Star Game